The 2018 African Fencing Championships was held at the El Menzah Sports Palace in Tunis, Tunisia from 5 to 9 June 2018.

Medal summary

Men's events

Women's events

Medal table
 Host

References

2018
African Fencing Championships
International sports competitions hosted by Tunisia
2018 in Tunisian sport
Fencing competitions in Tunisia
African Fencing Championships